Golets-Torny Group is a group of cinder cones located in the northern part of Iturup Island, Kuril Islands, Russia.

See also
 List of volcanoes in Russia
 Golets (geography)

References
 

Iturup
Cinder cones
Volcanoes of the Kuril Islands